Albin Chalandon (11 June 1920 – 29 July 2020) was a French politician and minister.

Between 1968 and 1972, he was Minister of Public Works. And from 1986 until 1988, he was Minister of Justice.

Between 1967 and 1968, he was a member of the Union for the New Republic, then between 1968 and 1976 he was a member of the Union of Democrats for the Republic and finally from 1986 until 1988 he was a member of the Rally for the Republic.

References

|-

|-

1920 births
2020 deaths
French centenarians
Men centenarians
People from Ain
Politicians from Auvergne-Rhône-Alpes
Union for the New Republic politicians
Union of Democrats for the Republic politicians
Rally for the Republic politicians
French Ministers of Justice
French Ministers of Public Works
Lycée Condorcet alumni
University of Paris alumni
Inspection générale des finances (France)
Deputies of the 3rd National Assembly of the French Fifth Republic
Deputies of the 4th National Assembly of the French Fifth Republic
Deputies of the 5th National Assembly of the French Fifth Republic
Deputies of the 8th National Assembly of the French Fifth Republic
Grand Croix of the Légion d'honneur